The Golden Pebble is a thriller by the Scottish author Margot Bennett, published in 1948.

Plot
Mark Rector is an entomologist who specializes in weevils. His sedate and dull life is unexpectedly disrupted when he travels to a remote village in Cornwall from where his uncle once mysteriously received a piece of gold.

Reviews
The Times Literary Supplement included the book in their issue of 6 December 1947, writing Mrs Bennett's first non detective novel deals with a gold rush in Cornwall- and human nature in the raw.

Notes
 The book originally cost eight shillings and sixpence.
 The book, like most of Bennett's other works, is no longer in print.
 This was the last instance that Bennett's work was published by Nicholson & Watson. Most of her other works were published by Eyre and Spottiswoode.

References

1948 British novels
British thriller novels
Novels set in Cornwall
Novels by Margot Bennett